Guillermo Giumelli (born 21 March 1962) is an Argentine alpine skier. He competed in three events at the 1980 Winter Olympics.

References

1962 births
Living people
Argentine male alpine skiers
Olympic alpine skiers of Argentina
Alpine skiers at the 1980 Winter Olympics
Place of birth missing (living people)